Émilie-Joane Heymans (born December 14, 1981) is a Canadian diver. She was born in Brussels, Belgium and raised in Greenfield Park, a suburb of Montreal. Heymans has won four Olympic medals, two bronze and two silver. She was the first female diver to win medals in four consecutive Olympic games and the first Canadian to win medals in four consecutive Olympics. Heymans also is a one time world champion and has won four Pan American championships as well as one Commonwealth Games championship. In addition she has won multiple medals in all three of these competitions.

Career
Before becoming a diver, Heymans was a gymnast. She began diving in 1993, at age 11, after her coaches told her she did not have the physique to be a gymnast. Emilie made her international debut  with Anne Montminy at the 2000 Olympic Games in Sydney, where they won a silver medal in the 10m synchronized diving event. Heymans then set her sights on the 10m platform and became the 2003 World Champion in Barcelona. At the 2004 Olympic Games in Athens, she proved herself again in the 10m synchronized diving event when she, along with teammate Blythe Hartley, took home the bronze medal.

Going into the 2008 Summer Olympics she failed to qualify with partner Marie-Eve Marleau in the platform synchro event, which was considered a huge upset. In order to qualify for the 2008 games, Heymans had to re-focus on the solo platform, an event where she had failed to medal in two Olympics in a row. Heymans won the silver medal at the Beijing 2008 Olympics in the 10m individual event, and only a solid final dive by the Chinese competitor kept her off of the top of the podium. This medal secured her recognition as an outstanding diver in both individual and synchronized diving events. She had won medals in three consecutive Olympics, achieved by only five other Canadian Olympians.

The years of abuse her body suffered as a result of platform diving caused pernicious neck and shoulder injuries, which compelled a switch to the springboard. In 2009, Heymans won the silver medal at the World Championships in Rome in the 3M springboard.  In 2011, at the World Championships in Shanghai, Heymans, with partner Jennifer Abel, won the silver medal in the 3m synchro event.

At the 2012 Olympics, Émilie became the first Canadian Summer Olympian to win a medal in four straight Olympics, winning a bronze medal in 3m synchronized diving, along with partner Abel. Sylvie Bernier, a CBC Sports analyst and former gold medal diver, said of Heymans that "Emilie has won a medal at four straight Games and with three different partners. She has a quiet confidence and always believes she can do it.  She doesn't need to tell the whole world." Heymans herself said of her record-setting medal, "It's awesome. I'm really happy that I was able to win my fourth medal with Jennifer. We worked really hard over the last two years."

In January 2013, Heymans retired from the sport.

Personal life
Born in Brussels, Heymans moved with her family to Quebec after her mother competed at the 1976 Summer Olympics in Montreal as a fencer. Her mother, Marie-Paule Van Eyck, was an Olympic fencer for Belgium.

Competitive history 
 Heymans won a silver medal at the 2000 Summer Olympics in 10 m platform synchro with partner Anne Montminy.
 Heymans won a gold medal at the 2003 World Championships in Barcelona, Spain in the 10 m platform.
 Heymans won a bronze medal at the 2004 Summer Olympics in the 10 m platform synchro with partner Blythe Hartley.
 Heymans won silver at the 2008 Summer Olympics in the women's 10 metre platform event. This was the first individual Olympic medal for Heymans.
 Heymans won bronze at the 2012 Summer Olympics in the women's 3 metre springboard synchronized diving event, with partner Jennifer Abel.

References

External links 
 
 
 

1981 births
Living people
Olympic divers of Canada
Divers at the 2000 Summer Olympics
Divers at the 2002 Commonwealth Games
Divers at the 2004 Summer Olympics
Divers at the 2006 Commonwealth Games
Divers at the 2007 Pan American Games
Divers at the 2008 Summer Olympics
Divers at the 2010 Commonwealth Games
Divers at the 2011 Pan American Games
Divers at the 2012 Summer Olympics
Olympic silver medalists for Canada
Olympic bronze medalists for Canada
Commonwealth Games bronze medallists for Canada
Belgian emigrants to Canada
Sportspeople from Quebec
Francophone Quebec people
Canadian people of Flemish descent
Canadian people of Belgian descent
People from Saint-Lambert, Quebec
Olympic medalists in diving
Université du Québec à Montréal alumni
Sportspeople from Brussels
Canadian female divers
Medalists at the 2012 Summer Olympics
Medalists at the 2008 Summer Olympics
Medalists at the 2004 Summer Olympics
Medalists at the 2000 Summer Olympics
World Aquatics Championships medalists in diving
Commonwealth Games gold medallists for Canada
Commonwealth Games silver medallists for Canada
Pan American Games gold medalists for Canada
Pan American Games silver medalists for Canada
Commonwealth Games medallists in diving
Pan American Games medalists in diving
Divers at the 2003 Pan American Games
Divers at the 1999 Pan American Games
Medalists at the 1999 Pan American Games
Medalists at the 2011 Pan American Games
Medallists at the 2002 Commonwealth Games
Medallists at the 2006 Commonwealth Games